The Kids' Lit Quiz is an annual literature competition, in which teams of four students, aged 10 to 14, work together to answer wide-ranging literary questions.  The winning team from each region competes in the national final. The winner of the national final is then invited to the World Final held annually in July or August. Since its inception in 1991, thousands of students have participated each year throughout the world.

The quiz was created by Wayne Mills, a former educator at the University of Auckland, who wears a purple and black hat while hosting this literary quiz. In 2008 Wayne Mills was given the Storylines Margaret Mahy Medal and Lecture Award to recognize his achievement in establishing the Kids' Lit Quiz. He was made a Member of the New Zealand Order of Merit in the Queen's New Year's Honours in 2011 for meritorious services to education, specifically children's literature. In August 2018 he was granted Life Membership of Storyline's Children's Literature Trust and Foundation.

In 2003 the quiz was brought to the UK where over 400 schools currently participate in the heats leading to the world final. This pattern is repeated in different countries around the world.

The Kids' Lit Quiz motivates and inspires children to read a wide range of children's literature for pleasure from the classics to the contemporary, from nursery rhymes to comics, and from folk tales to myths. It offers children rewards they may not otherwise experience in the classroom setting.

Currently the quiz takes place in New Zealand, the United Kingdom, South Africa, Nigeria, Canada, United States of America, Australia, Hong Kong, Thailand, Indonesia and Singapore. Singapore was the first country in Asia to have the quiz.

World Finals 
The 2004 world final was held on 20 June in Auckland, NZ and the winner was Dunblane High School from Scotland.
The 2005 world final was held 11 June in Auckland, NZ and the winner was St Margaret's College from Christchurch, NZ.
The 2006 world final was held 18 June in Auckland, NZ and the winner was St Margaret's College from Christchurch, NZ.
The 2007 world final was held on 9 July in Oxford, and the winner was Wellington College, Belfast.

The 2008 world final was held on 10 July at the Oxford Playhouse in Oxford. The winner was Arnold House School from London.

The 2009 World Final was held on 3 August in Johannesburg, South Africa. The winner was Bancroft's School from Woodford Green, England. The runner-up team included singer-songwriter Lorde.

The 2010 World Final was held on 14 August in the Performing Arts Centre at Stewart's Melville College in Edinburgh.  The winner was the City of London School for Girls.

The 2011 World Final was held on 19 July at Southwell School in Hamilton, New Zealand. The winner was Manor Gardens Primary School from Durban, South Africa.

The 2012 World final was held on 4 July at the University of Auckland, New Zealand. The winner was Awakeri Primary School from the Bay of Plenty, New Zealand.

The 2013 world final was held in Durban, South Africa. The winner was Roedean School (South Africa) from Johannesburg, South Africa.

The 2014 world final was held in the Princess Pavilion, Falmouth, Cornwall, England. The winner was City of London School for Girls.

The 2015 world final was held on 8 July at the Central Connecticut State University, USA. The winner was Southwell School from New Zealand.

The 2016 world final was held at the Aotea Centre, Auckland, New Zealand. The winner was Wellesley College from New Zealand.

The 2017 world final was held at the Oakville Centre for the Performing Arts, Ontario, Canada. The winner was St John's College from Johannesburg, South Africa

The 2018 world final was held at St Kentigern Boys' School, Remuera, Auckland, New Zealand. The winner was Canberra Grammar School from Australia.

The 2019 World Final was held at Sota School of the Arts in Singapore. The winner was Churchill Road Elementary School from the United States of America, with New Zealand and South Africa taking 2nd and 3rd. 

The 2020 World Finals was to be held at Hamilton, New Zealand but due to concerns about the spread of COVID-19 it was cancelled.

See also 
 List of winners of the Kids' Lit Quiz
The 2021 World Final was cancelled due to the Covid pandemic
The 2022 World Final had to be cancelled due to the Covid pandemic.

References

External links
Kids' Lit Quiz official website
Canadian website
UK website

Reading (process)
Student quiz competitions